is a Japanese writer and former rock band drummer with the band Chatmonchy.

Books
The Sun Jumped Out Of The Universe (2010, poem)
The House and the Desert (2012, poetry, short stories)
Kumiko Takahashi go 1st small Edo Kawagoe history poetry of the journey (2013, statement, poetry)
While Thinking, While Mourning, While Driving (2013)
Hitonoyume and Kumiko Takahashi, Go! (2013, statement, poetry)
Tomorrow's Rabbit (2015, statement)

References

1982 births
Living people
Japanese poets
21st-century Japanese poets
21st-century Japanese women writers
Japanese rock drummers
Women drummers
21st-century drummers
21st-century women musicians